Club y Biblioteca Ramón Santamarina, also known simply as Santamarina, is an Argentine football club from the city of Tandil, Buenos Aires Province. The team currently plays in Primera B Nacional, the tournament of second division of the Argentine Football Association. The club is named after Joaquin Ramón Cesareo Manuel Santamarina (1827-1904), an Argentine businessman.

The club has only played one season in the Argentine Primera. In 1985, it competed in the National championships, where it finished second in their group to qualify for the 2nd round where it was eliminated by Independiente 6–3 on aggregate.

Players

Current squad
.

Honours
Torneo Argentino A (1): 2013–14
Torneo Argentino B (1): 2005–06
Liga Tandilense: 31

References

External links
 Official Twitter
 Official Facebook

 
Association football clubs established in 1913
Football clubs in Buenos Aires Province
1913 establishments in Argentina
Tandil Partido